The Roman Catholic Diocese of Santa Rosa in California is a diocese, or ecclesiastical territory, of the Roman Catholic Church in the northern California region of the United States, named in honor of St. Rose of Lima.  It comprises the Counties of Del Norte, Humboldt, Lake, Mendocino, Napa and Sonoma.  Also known as the See of Santa Rosa in California, it is led by a bishop, currently Bishop Robert Francis Vasa, who pastors the mother church in the City of Santa Rosa, the Cathedral of Saint Eugene. 

The diocese was established on February 21, 1962 from portions of the Archdiocese of San Francisco and the Diocese of Sacramento.

Today, the See of Santa Rosa in California remains a suffragan of the ecclesiastical province of the Archdiocese of San Francisco.  Its fellow suffragan dioceses include the Dioceses of Honolulu, Hawaii; Las Vegas, Nevada; Oakland, California; Reno, Nevada; Sacramento, California; Salt Lake City, Utah; San Jose, California and Stockton, California.

On March 10, 2023, after nearly 200 sex abuse lawsuits, the diocese announced that it will be filing for Chapter 11 bankruptcy on March 13, 2023, in which they did so that exact day.

Bishops

Bishops of Santa Rosa in California
 Leo Thomas Maher (1962–1969), appointed Bishop of San Diego
 Mark Joseph Hurley (1969–1986)
 John Thomas Steinbock (1987–1991), appointed Bishop of Fresno
 George Patrick Ziemann (1992–1999)
 Daniel Francis Walsh (2000–2011)
 Robert Francis Vasa (2011–present)

Coadjutor Bishop
 Robert Francis Vasa (2010–2011)

Parishes and missions

The diocese includes approximately 63 parish and mission churches. The diocese is divided geographically in into five deaneries as follows: Humboldt/Del Norte (Del Norte and Humboldt Counties); Mendocino/Lake (Lake and Mendocino Counties); Napa (Napa County); Sonoma North (northern Sonoma County); and Sonoma South (southern Sonoma County). A list of these churches is found at List of churches in the Roman Catholic Diocese of Santa Rosa in California.

Roman Catholic schools

Elementary schools
St. John the Baptist School, Healdsburg
St. Apollinaris School, Napa
St. Vincent de Paul School, Petaluma
St. Eugene's Cathedral Elementary School, Santa Rosa
St. Rose Elementary School, Santa Rosa
St. Francis Solano School, Sonoma
St. Mary of the Angels School, Ukiah
San Jose Sanchez Del Rio Catholic School , Fort Bragg

High schools 
 St. Bernard's High School, Eureka
 Justin-Siena High School, Napa
 Kolbe Academy and Trinity Prep*, Napa
 St. Vincent de Paul High School, Petaluma
 Cardinal Newman High School, Santa Rosa
 Archbishop Hanna High School, Sonoma
 * Independently operated in the Catholic tradition.

Roman Catholic hospitals
Hospitals listed on the Diocese of Santa Rosa website:
Queen of the Valley Medical Center (Napa, California),
Redwood Memorial Hospital, Fortuna
Petaluma Valley Hospital, Petaluma
Santa Rosa Memorial Hospital, Santa Rosa
St. Joseph Hospital, Eureka
Humboldt Home Health, Eureka

See also

 Catholic Church by country
 Catholic Church in the United States
 Ecclesiastical Province of San Francisco
 Global organisation of the Catholic Church
 List of Roman Catholic archdioceses (by country and continent)
 List of Roman Catholic dioceses (alphabetical) (including archdioceses)
 List of Roman Catholic dioceses (structured view) (including archdioceses)
 List of the Catholic dioceses of the United States

Notes

External links
 Roman Catholic Diocese of Santa Rosa Official Site

Catholic Church in California
Del Norte County, California
Culture of Humboldt County, California
Lake County, California
Religious buildings and structures in Mendocino County, California
Napa County, California
Christian organizations established in 1962
Companies that filed for Chapter 11 bankruptcy in 2023
 
Santa Rosa in California
Santa Rosa